Capt. C. Goodale House is a historic home located at Southampton in Suffolk County, New York. It was built in 1875 and is a large -story, five bay residence with an original 2-story (flat roofed) rear wing and smaller period wing. It features a central entrance pavilion, mansard roof, and wraparound porch.  It is an example of Second Empire architecture. Also on the property is a contributing privy.

It was added to the National Register of Historic Places in 1986.

References

Houses on the National Register of Historic Places in New York (state)
Second Empire architecture in New York (state)
Houses completed in 1875
National Register of Historic Places in Southampton (town), New York
Southampton (village), New York
Houses in Suffolk County, New York
1875 establishments in New York (state)